Spilotragus is a genus of longhorn beetles of the subfamily Lamiinae, containing the following species:

subgenus Crucitragus
 Spilotragus crucifer Aurivillius, 1908

subgenus Spilotragus
 Spilotragus clarkei Breuning, 1976
 Spilotragus guttatus Breuning, 1934
 Spilotragus ornatus (Gahan, 1898)
 Spilotragus variabilis (Jordan, 1897)
 Spilotragus xanthus Jordan, 1903

References

Tragocephalini
Cerambycidae genera